Eugene Lee (born February 14, 1973) is an American sports agent. With over eighteen years of experience as an NFLPA certified contract advisor, Lee has represented over fifty NFL players over the past decade.

Background 
Lee was born and raised in Canton, Ohio by his parents, a teacher and an engineer. Growing up, he was a member of the Boy Scouts of America and earned the rank of Eagle Scout. After high school, Lee earned his Bachelor of Business Administration degree, summa cum laude, in Accountancy from the University of Notre Dame and his Juris Doctor degree from Notre Dame Law School. Lee was a National Merit Scholar and a member of Beta Alpha Psi and Beta Gamma Sigma.

Career 
After graduation from law school, Lee practiced law in New York City at Fish & Neave and Brown Raysman where he specialized in the practice areas of intellectual property, licensing, branding, outsourcing and information technology.

ETL Associates, Inc. 

Lee served as the founder and president of ETL Associates, Inc. ("ETL"), his first NFL player representation agency from May 2001 to April 2015. During this time span, Lee was the first NFL agent to negotiate a 53-man roster salary for a client on a practice squad. As a result of this negotiation, the NFLPA revised its bylaws and opened the door for other players to collect greater compensation while under contract to NFL teams.

MBK Sports Management Group, LLC 

After ETL Associates, Inc., Lee formed MBK Sports Management Group, LLC in May 2015. It is an NFL player representation agency headquartered out of New York City with offices in Cleveland and Los Angeles.

As managing member of MBK, Lee is responsible for overseeing a team consisting of four NFLPA certified contract advisors, a player development consultant (and former NFL general manager) and five full-time employees. Lee and his team have negotiated NFL player contracts totaling well over $1 billion.

Television and Film

ESPN's 30 for 30 "The Dotted Line" 

Lee was the NFL agent featured in Morgan Spurlock's 2011 ESPN 30 for 30 documentary about the inside world of sports agents. The documentary, titled The Dotted Line, revealed the behind the scenes lives of top NFL, NBA, and MLB sports agents and followed their ups and downs from recruiting and marketing top-tier clients to negotiating record breaking contracts.

Television

Lee is a frequent guest on Fox News, Fox Business, CNN, CNBC, CBN, Bloomberg and other publications to provide insight as an industry expert on NFL player contracts, the salary cap, the collective bargaining agreement and athlete branding.

Author & Motivational Speaker 
In October 2015, Lee published his first book, My Brother’s Keeper: Above and Beyond The Dotted Line with the NFL’s Most Ethical Agent. The book focuses on several NFL players in various stages of their careers and the integrity and faith with which Lee conducts his business in an otherwise cutthroat industry.

Lee speaks at law schools nationwide, including Harvard, Fordham University, NYU and Notre Dame.

Philanthropy
Lee serves on the Board of Directors for the New York City chapter of Positive Coaching Alliance, a not-for-profit organization dedicated to the development and well-rounded growth of student-athletes and coaches nationwide.

External links
 Michael Sam: Courage In The Line of Fire
 Op Ed: Two Minute Drill
 Brady's Burden: A Legal perspective on "Deflategate"

References

American sports agents
1973 births
Living people